The British Journal of Clinical Pharmacology is a monthly peer-reviewed medical journal published by Wiley-Blackwell on behalf of the British Pharmacological Society. It covers all aspects of drug action in humans and was established in 1974. , the editor-in-chief is Serge Cremers (Columbia University). The previous editors were Adam Cohen (Leiden University), until 2018, and James Ritter (King's College London).

Abstracting and indexing
According to the Journal Citation Reports, the journal has a 2021 impact factor of 3.716 and a 5 year impact factor of 4.282, ranking it 131st out of 279 journals in the category Pharmacology & Pharmacy.

References

External links

Facebook Site
Twitter Account

Health in the London Borough of Islington
Wiley-Blackwell academic journals
Pharmacology journals
Monthly journals
English-language journals
Publications established in 1974
Academic journals associated with learned and professional societies of the United Kingdom